is a private university in the town of Kumatori in Osaka Prefecture, Japan. The school was established in 1965.

Notable alumni 
Nobuko Fujimura, athlete
Siro Fujise, baseball player
Yoshikazu Hiroshima, football umpire
Kojiro Ishii, sports scientist
Mizuho Katayama, synchronised swimming coach and former Olympic competitor
Hiroyoshi Kuwabara, football player
Kazuya Maeda, football player
Toru Murata, baseball player
Makoto Okiguchi, gymnast
Tomi Shimomura, football player
Hiromitsu Takagi, baseball player
Koji Uehara, baseball player
Yasuhiro Ueyama, gymnast
Hitoshi Wataida, baseball umpire
Atsushi Yamamoto, athlete

External links
 Official website

Educational institutions established in 1965
Private universities and colleges in Japan
Universities and colleges in Osaka Prefecture
Kansai Collegiate American Football League
1965 establishments in Japan
Kumatori, Osaka
Sports universities and colleges